Police, Adjective is a 2009 Romanian drama film directed by Corneliu Porumboiu. The movie focuses on policeman Cristi, who is investigating a teenage boy who has been smoking hashish.  Over time, Cristi begins to question the ethical ramifications of his task.

Cast 
 Dragoș Bucur – Cristi
 Vlad Ivanov – Captain Anghelache
 Ion Stoica – Nelu
 Irina Săulescu – Anca
 Cerasela Trandafir – Gina
 Marian Ghenea – Attorney
 Cosmin Seleși – Costi
 Șerban Georgevici – Sica
 George Remeș – Vali
 Adina Dulcu – Dana
 Dan Cogălniceanu – Gica
 Constantin Diță – Officer on Duty
 Alexandru Sabadac – Alex
 Anca Diaconu – Doina
 Radu Costin – Victor
 Viorel Nebunu – Alex's Father
 Emanuela Țiglă – Alex's Mother
 Daniel Birsan – Barman
 Bungeanu Mioara – Magazine seller

Reception

Critical reception
On review aggregator website Rotten Tomatoes, the film holds an approval rating of 78% based on 73 reviews, and an average rating of 7.1/10. On Metacritic, the film has a weighted average score of 81 out of 100, based on 23 critics, indicating "universal acclaim".

Awards 
Police, Adjective won the Jury Prize in the Un Certain Regard section at the 2009 Cannes Film Festival.

The film was the official Romanian entry for the Academy Award for Best Foreign Language Film at the 82nd Academy Awards.

See also 
 Romanian New Wave

References

External links 

2009 films
Romanian drama films
2000s Romanian-language films
2009 drama films
Films directed by Corneliu Porumboiu